Castletownshend (literally "town of the castle") is a village about  south-east of Skibbereen, in County Cork, Ireland. The village developed around a small 17th-century castle built by Richard Townsend, whose descendants still reside there.

Architecture
The main street of the town, lined with large homes from the 18th century, runs down a sharply sloped hill leading to Castlehaven Harbour and the castle.

The Church of St Barrahane, built in 1826, overlooks the town. Its main architect was James Pain. This replaced the original church built in 1761. It is noted for its stained glass windows; the east window by Harry Clarke, was given to the church in 1915 in memory of Mr and Mrs Somerville by their grandchildren. The window in the south wall of the chancel and the third window on the south side are also by Clarke. The eastern window on the north side, the easternmost window on the south side and the second window on the south side are all by Powell's of London.

In the church porch there is an oar from a rescue boat from the Lusitania (sunk by a German U-Boat in 1915) in memory of the many drowned passengers and crew who were brought into the harbour.

People
Castletownsend was the home of Edith Anna Œnone Somerville the co-author of the Irish RM series of humorous novels on Irish Life in the early 1900s.

Sir Patrick Buckley (1841–1896) was born near the village in the townland of Gortbrack.

See also
 List of towns and villages in the Republic of Ireland

References

External links

 Buildings of Ireland: Drishane House

Towns and villages in County Cork